Flight incidents may refer to:

Aviation accidents and incidents
List of air rage incidents